Koptyayevskaya is a rural locality (a village) in Nizhne-Vazhskoye Rural Settlement, Verkhovazhsky District, Vologda Oblast, Russia. The population was 41 as of 2002.

Geography 
Koptyayevskaya is located 11 km southeast of Verkhovazhye (the district's administrative centre) by road. Kalichye is the nearest rural locality.

References 

Rural localities in Verkhovazhsky District